Petroleum och tång was released on 14 November 2007, and is a studio album by Eva Dahlgren, with her ballad hit songs between 1980-2005.

Track listing
Petroleum och tång
Vad andra gör
Jag är inte fri
Novemberregn
Ingen är som jag
Skuggorna faller över dig
När jag såg dig
Varje dag
Du och jag
Ord
Syre och eld

Contributors
Eva Dahlgren - singer, guitar, composer, lyrics
Lars Halapi - guitar, percussion, steel guitar, synthesizer, producer
Peter Forss - bass
Måns Block - drums
Christer Karlsson - piano
Stockholm Session Strings - musicians

Charts

References 

2007 albums
Eva Dahlgren albums